Zelanophilidae is a family of centipedes belonging to the order Geophilomorpha and superfamily Geophiloidea.

Genera:
 Australiophilus Verhoeff, 1925	 
 Tasmanophilus Chamberlin, 1920	 
 Zelanophilus Chamberlin, 1920

References

Geophilomorpha
Centipede families